This is a list of Belgian football transfers for the 2010-11 winter transfer window. Only transfers involving a team from the Jupiler League are listed.

The winter transfer window opens on 1 January 2011, although a few transfers may take place prior to that date. The window closes at midnight on 1 February 2011. Players without a club may join one, either during or in between transfer windows.

Sorted by date

September 2010

October 2010

November 2010

December 2010

End of 2010
Some players were on a loan which ended in 2010. As of 1 January 2011, they returned to their original club and are listed here. For a list of players on loan during the last year, see List of Belgian football transfers winter 2009–10 and summer 2010.

January 2011

February 2011

Sorted by team

Anderlecht

In:

Out:

Cercle Brugge

In:

Out:

Charleroi

In:

Out:

Club Brugge

In:

Out:

Eupen

In:

Out:

Genk

In:

Out:

Gent

In:

Out:

Germinal Beerschot

In:

Out:

Kortrijk

In:

Out:

Lierse

In:

 

Out:

Lokeren

In:

Out:

Mechelen

In:

Out:

Sint-Truiden

In:

Out:

Standard Liège

In:

 

Out:

Westerlo

In:

Out:

Zulte Waregem

In:

Out:

References

Belgian
Transfers Winter
2010 Winter